Israr-ul-Haq (born 23 November 1991) is a Pakistani cricketer. He made his first-class debut for Habib Bank Limited in the 2017–18 Quaid-e-Azam Trophy on 9 October 2017. He made his List A debut for Habib Bank Limited in the 2017–18 Departmental One Day Cup on 1 January 2018.

References

External links
 

1991 births
Living people
Pakistani cricketers
Place of birth missing (living people)
Habib Bank Limited cricketers